Daniel J. Campbell (December 26, 1874 – April 28, 1955) was a private serving in the United States Marine Corps during the Spanish–American War who received the Medal of Honor for bravery.

Biography
Campbell was born on December 26, 1874, in Prince Edward Island, Canada. He joined the Marine Corps from Boston in August 1896, and was honorably discharged in October 1901.

Campbell died on April 28, 1955, and was buried at Mount Hope Cemetery in Mattapan, Massachusetts.

Medal of Honor citation
Rank and organization: Private, U.S. Marine Corps. Born: 26 October 1874, Prince Edward Island, Canada. Accredited to: Massachusetts. G.O. No.: 521, 7 July 1899.

Citation:

On board the U.S.S. Marblehead during the cutting of the cable leading from Cienfuegos, Cuba, 11 May 1898. Facing the heavy fire of the enemy, Campbell set an example of extraordinary bravery and coolness throughout this action.

See also

List of Medal of Honor recipients for the Spanish–American War

References

External links

1874 births
1955 deaths
United States Marine Corps Medal of Honor recipients
United States Marines
American military personnel of the Spanish–American War
Canadian-born Medal of Honor recipients
Canadian emigrants to the United States
People from Prince Edward Island
Spanish–American War recipients of the Medal of Honor